The Black Obelisk is a novel written in 1956 by the German author Erich Maria Remarque.  This novel paints a portrait of Germany in the early 1920s, a period marked by hyperinflation and rising nationalism.

Ludwig, the protagonist, is in his mid twenties; just like most of his friends, he is a World War I veteran.  Although aspiring to be a poet, he works for a friend, Georg, managing the office of a small tombstone company. He tries to earn some extra money as a private tutor to a son of a bookstore owner, and by playing the organ at the chapel of a local insane asylum.

Thanks to this diversity of activities, Ludwig interacts with a wide cross-section of the German population of his town and the surrounding villages and we are allowed to witness those interactions.  We see, for example, businessmen – some trying to stick to the old principles and going bankrupt, others speculating on stocks, exploiting the system and becoming rich in morally ambiguous ways.  We see war veterans – some highly critical of the old ways that led them to a failed war, others longing for the old days of military discipline and turning into inflexible nationalists hailing the virtues of their rising leader, Adolf Hitler.

A lot of events are connected to women. Two of them leave Ludwig, just because he cannot float in the contemporary world of greed and money. He chose to stay "clean", maybe not by himself, but he cannot be anything other than true to his ideals and now he has to live with that choice. A third woman, probably the most important to him, is Genevieve Terhoven, whom he meets at the insane asylum. She is there for being schizophrenic and considers herself to be "Isabelle" most of the time. Ludwig gets more and more attached to her, feeling a "pure" love for her because she sees the world so differently.

The line "The death of one man is a tragedy, the death of millions is a statistic" (Aber das ist wohl so, weil ein einzelner immer der Tod ist — und zwei Millionen immer nur eine Statistik.) is often not credited to the book but attributed to Soviet leader Joseph Stalin.

In popular culture

The 1998 Emir Kusturica movie Black Cat, White Cat contains a scene where a lady nicknamed Black Obelisk pulls a nail from a wooden beam using her behind — a direct reference to the Remarque novel where a certain Frau Beckmann is said to pull off the same feat.

Sources
Adapted with permission from 

1956 German novels
Novels by Erich Maria Remarque
Fiction set in 1923
Novels set in Germany
Kiepenheuer & Witsch books